Lafuzu is a Maldivian family drama web series written by Mariyam Moosa and directed by Ahmed Nimal. It stars Mariyam Shifa, Ali Azim and Adam Saeed in main roles. The pilot episode of the series was released on 26 February 2022.

Cast and characters

Main
 Mariyam Shifa as Laika
 Ali Azim as Akif
 Adam Saeed as Ahmed Yazan Ali
 Fathimath Latheefa as Zareena
 Aishath Thuhufa as Nadha
 Arifa Ali as Rasheedha
 Abdulla Naseer as Husnee

Recurring
 Ahmed Nimal as Ali Shareef "Alibe"
 Mariyam Shakeela as Samihtha
 Hassan Zivaan
 Aishath Yasna
 Aishath Mahmoodh
 Yoosuf Yuaan as young Yumnu
 Looth Laizaan as young Nihadh
 Ramsha Ibrahim as young Laika
 Mohamed Afrah as Jalaal

Guest
 Hawwa Shadhiya as Aathi (Episode 2)

Episodes

Soundtrack

Release and reception
The series was made available for streaming through Medianet Multi Screen on 26 February 2022. The first two episodes of the series received mixed reviews from critics.

References

Serial drama television series
Maldivian television shows
Maldivian web series